Shooting at the 2003 South Pacific Games was held from 8–11 July at the Royal Fiji Military Forces Shooting Range at Vatuwaqa in Suva, Fiji. The competition was postponed for four days from the original schedule due to high winds at the venue. Tahiti and Fiji were the most successful gold medal-winning nations, winning four and two respectively.

Teams
There were six nations competing:

Medal summary

Medal table

Shotgun results
Three down-the-line clay target disciplines were contested and medals were awarded for both individual and team events. The competition was not gender specific, with all events open to men and women. However, all shooters at these games were male.

References

External links

2003 South Pacific Games
2003
Pacific Games